Alexandra Bridge Provincial Park is a provincial park located in the Fraser Canyon of British Columbia, Canada. It was established on March 26, 1984 to preserve a historically significant suspension bridge spanning the Fraser River.  The extant bridge was built in 1926 on foundation piers from 1863.

History
The Nlaka'pamux and Sto:lo First Nations have inhabited the area for over 9,500 years.  The first persons of European descent known to have visited the site were Simon Fraser and his crew during their expedition down the Fraser Canyon in 1808.  Situated at a narrows in the canyon, with room for the necessary abutments, the site was an important fishing site for the Sto:lo and Nlaka'pamux First Nations peoples. Like all such locations in the Fraser Canyon (which are many), there was a large aboriginal village on the west bank just downstream from the bridge site in pre-railway times. Fish-drying racks can still be seen at the location today, and were visible in historic photographs from early times.

A difficult and costly trail, intended to link Fort Langley with New Caledonia because of the loss of the old route in the wake of the Oregon Treaty of 1846, began on the east bank of the river and switchbacked up the mountainside, with "staircases" made for the mules and other pack animals. Dangerous and beset with difficult snows, the trail was abandoned after only a few uses and superseded by trails connecting inland farther south. There is mention of a  pole-bridge built by aboriginal people at the site, torn down to make way for the "new" one of the 1860s, but a ferry also operated in this area connecting with Kequaloose on the east bank, where the Brigade Trail begins its climb over the Cascade Mountains before descending back to the Fraser via the Anderson River at Boston Bar. During the Fraser Canyon Gold Rush in 1858, a ferry service was established here in a monopoly situation, as J.W. Hicks, the magistrate at Yale, had his "fingers in the pie," as with many other businesses under his official purview. (Hicks was fired because of his various indiscretions during the affair known as McGowan's War.)

Just above the bridge on the east bank is Alexandra Lodge, on the site of one of the more important roadhouses of the many on the Cariboo Road, situated at the base of the arduous climb up the next hill northwards and at the end of the torturous journey connected Yale to Spuzzum.  Also nearby is the Alexandra Tunnel, one of many on the route of the Canadian National Railway through the Fraser Canyon.

Alexandra Bridge (1863-1894)

The first Alexandra suspension bridge was one of the two final links required to open the Cariboo Road between Yale and Clinton. Several sections of the new road through the Fraser Canyon had been built through 1862 by different groups and under different terms.  The road sections immediately on either side of the Alexandra crossing had been contracted by civil engineer Joseph Trutch, first the section on the east bank north to Boston Bar, then in a subsequent contract, the section on the west bank, extending south about eight miles from the crossing to "Pike's Riffle".

In winter 1863 the mainland colonial government reached an agreement with Trutch to build the suspension bridge.  Construction proceeded that spring and summer, with the bridge officially opening in September 1863.  Some of the preceding road sections included terms giving the contractors the right to collect tolls.  Joseph Trutch, already benefiting from this scheme on his road, saw similar terms awarded for the bridge.  The Alexandra toll house stood on the bridge's western side.

Two decades on, the Canadian Pacific Railway was built through the same canyon, severing the road and supplanting of transport modes from animal-powered carts and carriages to steam-powered rail.  The original Alexandra bridge fell into disuse, and was destroyed by the rising waters of the Fraser Flood of 1894.  Its remains were dismantled in 1912.  The site continued without a fixed crossing for another decade.

Alexandra Bridge (1926-1964)

The automotive era saw a reinvestment in roads in the province, including the re-opening of the Fraser Canyon to road traffic in the form of the new Cariboo Highway.  In 1926 a new suspension bridge was built upon the footings of the original structure, with a deck level ten feet higher than the previous design.  This second Alexandra Suspension Bridge ceased to be used for automobile traffic in 1964, and is the key feature of the park today. Approximately two kilometres (one mile) downstream is the active Alexandra Bridge, constructed by the B.C. Ministry of Highways in 1960-64.  It is not a suspension bridge, but uses a high truss-arch span to cross the canyon.

Geography
The small 55 ha (136 acre) park is centred on the site of the original Cariboo Wagon Road bridge over the Fraser River. In addition, the site contains two well-defined glacio-fluvial benches that rise steeply on the east bank of the Fraser River.

Ecology
The site of the bridge, like most similar spots along the Fraser Canyon, is a traditional fishing spot because of the way the river is forced through narrow, steep banks, offering fishermen a chance to reach salmon struggling through the stronger current through the narrowed gorge. Millions of Spring, Coho, Chum, Pink and Sockeye salmon pass through the park on their way to spawning grounds every year. As well, the park contains many large tree species such as Western hemlock, Western redcedar and Douglas-fir.

Facilities
The park features a small picnic area with pit toilets and a wheelchair accessible trail leading to and beyond the bridge from the Trans-Canada Highway.

See also
 List of crossings of the Fraser River
 List of bridges in Canada
 Hells Gate
 Siska, British Columbia
 Bridge River Rapids

References

External links

Lidar-based 3D model of the Alexandra Bridge

1984 establishments in British Columbia
Fraser Canyon
Provincial parks of British Columbia
Suspension bridges in Canada